Hypostomus lima is a species of catfish in the family Loricariidae. It is native to South America, where it occurs in the São Francisco River basin. The species reaches 13.6 cm (5.4 inches) SL and is believed to be a facultative air-breather.

References 

Fish described in 1874
Endemic fauna of Brazil
Loricariidae
Catfish of South America
Fish of Brazil